NA-133 (Sheikhupura-III) was a constituency for the National Assembly of Pakistan.

Area
Municipal Corporation Sheikhupura
Following areas of Sheikhupura Tehsil
Sheikhupura Qanungo Halqa (excluding Ghazi Minara, Machike, and Ghang)
Sahuki Malian
Mudke
Muradey Kalan
Ghazi Androon
Noor Pur Virkan
Following areas of Ferozewala Tehsil
Galo
Kala
Khanpur
Mandiali

Election 2002 

General elections were held on 10 Oct 2002. Chaudhry Muhammad Saeed of PML-Q won by 30,105 votes.

Election 2008 

General elections were held on 18 Feb 2008. Mian Javed Latif of PML-N won by 44,786 votes.

Election 2013 

General elections were held on 11 May 2013. Mian Javed Latif of PML-N won by 68,909 votes and became the  member of National Assembly.

References

External links 
 Election result's official website

Abolished National Assembly Constituencies of Pakistan
NA-133